The 1870 America's Cup was the first America's Cup to be hosted in the United States, and the first "America's Cup" due to the trophy being renamed from the 100 Guineas Cup of 1851. It was the first competition after the founding of the "America's Cup" event with the deed of gift in 1857.

James Lloyd Ashbury's yacht Cambria sailed to New York on behalf of the Royal Thames Yacht Club.

The New York Yacht Club entered 17 schooners, and the race was won by Franklin Osgood's Magic.

Results

References

1870 in American sports
1870 in sailing
America's Cup regattas